Laufenburg railway station is a railway station in the municipality of Laufenburg, in the Swiss canton of Aargau. It is the easternmost passenger stop on the Koblenz–Stein-Säckingen line; between here and Koblenz the line is freight-only. The station is served by local trains only.

Services 
Laufenburg is served by the S1 the Basel S-Bahn:

 : hourly service to Basel SBB.

References

External links 
 
 

Railway stations in the canton of Aargau
Swiss Federal Railways stations